Stephen Burks is an American designer and a professor of architecture at Columbia University. Burks is known for his collaborations with artisans as well as incorporating craft and weaving into product design. He is the first African American to win the National Design Award for product design.

Early life and education 
Burks was born in Chicago in 1969. He studied architecture and product design at the Illinois Institute of Technology and Columbia University Graduate School of Architecture.

Career 
Burks first founded his personal studio in New York in 1997, then called Readymade. His trademark style, which includes incorporating craftsmanship and collaborating with artisans began in 2000, when Italian design brand Cappellini first put his designs into production. in 2003, Missoni commissioned him for Luxe fashion house. Patchwork vases, designed by him, was the first handmade objects produced in his studio. In 2005, Burks went to South Africa to collaborate with international artisans from countries such as South Africa, Senegal, and Philippines sponsored by Aid to Artisans. There he started working with hand-crafted furniture, baskets and fashion accessories which he became known for later in his career. 

Burks started his own design business at 2007 after meeting with Willard Musarurwa; a street vendor making wire souvenirs for tourists. After meeting each other in a local design institute at Cape Town, they launched TaTu wire outdoor furniture together which focused on Hand-crafted-style designed furniture and Artisan objects. 

Burks held his eponymous solo exhibition in 2011, named "Stephen Burks: Man Made" in Studio Museum in Harlem, where he exhibited his practice of merging craftsmanship and contemporary design. The exhibition included his work produced with artisans from countries such as South Africa, Senegal, and Peru.

In 2015, Burks won the Cooper Hewitt National Design Award for product design, the first . In 2019, Stephen became the first product designer to attain a Harvard Loeb Fellowship. Since, he has served as an expert in residence at the Harvard Innovation Lab. He also taught at Harvard Graduate School of Design.

His work is in the collections of the Cooper Hewitt, Smithsonian Design Museum, the High Museum of Art, as well as Corning Museum of Glass. His work is the subject of a forthcoming touring exhibition, "Stephen Burks: Shelter in Place," premiering at the High Museum of Art in September 2022.

Style 
Burks is known for directly working with Handcraft artisans such as basket weavers, and incorporating craft into his work. Burks describes his mission as "bringing the hand to industry."

Awards and honors 
 Illinois Institute of Technology Alumni Professional Achievement Award 
 Brooklyn Museum Modernism Young Designer Award
 Smithsonian Cooper Hewitt National Design Award in Product Design (2015)
 Architektur and Wohnen Audi Mentor Prize
 2008 United States Artists Target Fellowship
 Harvard Loeb Fellowship (2019)

See also 

 Design in Dialogue (interviews with artists and designers by Burks and Glenn Adamson)
 Design in Dialogue #14: Stephen Burks (by Glenn Adamson)
 Craft in America (interview)

References

External links 
 Stephen Burks Man Made
 Archiproducts - Stephen Burks

1969 births
Living people
African-American designers
African-American architects
Columbia University faculty
Wikipedia Student Program